Spilosoma wilemani is a species of moth of the family Erebidae. It was described by Walter Rothschild in 1914. It is found in Taiwan and Japan's southern Ryukyu Islands.

Description
Antenna of male serrate on upperside, pectinate on lower.

Male
Head and thorax rufous; palpi crimson at base, black at tips; lower part of frons black; antennae black; a crimson bar behind the eyes; fore coxae and the femora above crimson, the tibiae and tarsi black above; abdomen crimson, the ventral surface rufous, dorsal and lateral series of small black spots except at base and extremity. Forewing rufous; a small antemedial black spot above vein l; an oblique series of black points from below apex to inner margin beyond middle, almost obsolete from below vein 6 to above 2; slight subterminal black points between veins 5 and 3. Hindwing crimson; a minute discoidal black point; cilia pale at tips. Underside of forewing crimson.

Female
Frons black at sides only; hindwing with black discoidal spot and subterminal spots below vein 2 and on vein 1 nearer termen; underside of forewing with black discoidal spot.

The wingspan for the male is 30 mm and for the female it is 60 mm.

References

Moths described in 1914
wilemani